Opasan ples (trans. Dangerous Dance) is the fifth studio album from a Serbian rock band Van Gogh.

Track listing
"Puls" (S. Habić, S. Radivojević, Z. Đukić) – 4:08
"Da li zna?" (Z. Đukić) – 3:22
"Demagogija" (S. Radivojević Z. Đukić) – 3:08
"Pleme" (S. Habić, S. Radivojević, D. Maksimović) – 3:18
"Bez oblika" (Z. Đukić) – 3:51
"Opasan ples" (S. Habić, Z. Đukić) – 3:51
"Brod od papira" (Z. Đukić) – 3:22
"Teška ljubav" (Z. Đukić) – 4:28
"Otisak dlana" (S. Habić, Z. Đukić) – 4:04
"Zauvek" (S. Habić, Z. Đukić) – 3:53

Personnel
Zvonimir Đukić - vocals, guitar, mandolin, backing vocals
Srboljub Radivojević - drums, backing vocals

Additional personnel
Ryan Nemuryn - bass guitar
Nenad Stefanović - bass guitar
Dušan Bogović - bass guitar
Saša Habić - keyboards, percussion, producer

References 
 EX YU ROCK enciklopedija 1960-2006,  Janjatović Petar;

External links
Van Gogh homepage
Opasan ples at Discogs

1999 albums
Van Gogh (band) albums
Metropolis Records (Serbia) albums